Salussola is a comune (municipality) in the Province of Biella in the Italian region Piedmont, located about  northeast of Turin and about  southeast of Biella.

Salussola borders the following municipalities: Carisio, Cavaglià, Cerrione, Dorzano, Massazza, Roppolo, Verrone, Villanova Biellese.

In the last days of World War II, in Salussola was perpetrated a massacre where 20 partisans were murdered by Italian Fascist Soldiers.

References

Cities and towns in Piedmont